Raoul Albert La Roche (23 February 1889 - 15 June 1965) was a Swiss banker and art collector. He was especially interested in purism and cubism and his collections have been donated to museums in Switzerland and France. His home in Paris, Maison La Roche, was designed by his friend Le Corbusier and now houses the Le Corbusier Foundation.

Early life 
Raoul Albert La Roche was born on 23 February 1889, and grew up in Basel, Switzerland in a bourgeois family, very closely linked to the world of art. He was the second son of the banker Louis La Roche and Emilie Caroline Burckhardt. He studied at the School of Trading in Neuchâtel (Switzerland), and became an apprentice in the Bank of Basel, and worked in Berlin and London.

Career 
He made his career there, retiring in 1954.

In 1940, during the invasion of France by the German army, he left Paris and moved to Lyon, keeping his job at the bank, until the end of the war. He returned to Paris after the war.

Links with the artistic world 

In 1918, La Roche met Le Corbusier and was attracted to the purism style of painting whose foundations were laid by Le Corbusier.

In 1922, on the occasion of a trip to Venice and Vicenza (Italy) with Le Corbusier, La Roche planned to have a villa built by his friend. This project became the "Villa della Rocca" (Villa La Roche) in Paris, at the "". The villa was built in joint ownership with Le Corbusier's brother, the violinist Albert Jeanneret, and housed his collections of paintings, including works by Picasso, Braque,<ref>Michèle Richet, Nadine Pouillon, ill. Georges Braque, pages 30, 37, 55, Georges Braque: Orangerie des Tuileries, 16 octobre 1973 - 14 janvier 1974, ed. des Musées Nationaux, 1973</ref> Fernand Léger. La Roche donated this villa to Le Corbusier for his foundation.

 Death 

La Roche died on 15 June 1965 in Basel. He bequeathed one-third of his collection to the Musée du Louvre, another third to his hometown (Basel), which can be seen in the Kunstmuseum Basel, and the last third to the Fondation Le Corbusier.

 References 

 Further reading 

 Jacques Sbriglio, Le Corbusier: les villas la Roche-Jeanneret, éd. Fondation Le Corbusier, 1997, 
 La Revue des arts, vol. 3 à 4, pages 250–251, éd. Conseil des musées nationaux, 1953
 Pierre Courthion, D'une palette à l'autre: mémoires d'un critique d'art, éd. Baconnière Arts, 2004, 
  Andrew Ayers, The Architecture of Paris: An Architectural Guide, pages 245–247, Édition Axel Menges, 2004, 
  Christopher Green, Art in France, 1900-1940'', pages 57–58, ed. Yale University Press, 2003, 
 
 Modern Man: The Life of Le Corbusier, Architect of Tomorrow, p. 30 
  K. Schmidt, H. Fischer, éd., Ein Haus für den Kubismus: die Sammlung Raoul La Roche, p. 9  cat. expo. Bâle, 1998

External links 
 Schmidt, H. Katharina (2007) La Roche, Raoul. In Historiches Lexicon der Schweiz. (in German).
 Metropolitan Museum

1889 births
1965 deaths
Swiss art collectors
Patrons of the arts
People from Basel-Landschaft
Swiss bankers